Yauaperi (Jawaperi) may refer to:

Ninam language
Waimiri-Atroarí language